The 1972 United States Senate election in Arkansas took place on November 7, 1972. Incumbent U.S. Senator John L. McClellan was re-elected to a sixth term in office, defeating U.S. Representative David Pryor in a hotly contested primary. In the general election, McClellan easily defeated Republican physician Wayne Babbitt.
This was McClellan's final campaign; he died in his sleep in 1977. Pryor was elected Governor of Arkansas in 1974 and won the race to succeed McClellan in 1978.

Democratic primary

Candidates
Ted Boswell
Foster Johnson
David Pryor, U.S. Representative from Camden
John L. McClellan, incumbent Senator

Results

Run-off results
Since no candidate received a majority in the initial primary, a run-off election was held on June 13 between McClellan and Pryor.

General election

Results

See also
 1972 United States Senate elections

References 

1972
Arkansas
United States Senate